The following highways are numbered 243:

Canada
 Manitoba Provincial Road 243
 Prince Edward Island Route 243
 Quebec Route 243

Costa Rica
 National Route 243

Japan
 Japan National Route 243

United States
 Alabama State Route 243
 Arkansas Highway 243
 California State Route 243
 Connecticut Route 243
 Florida State Road 243
 Georgia State Route 243
 Indiana State Road 243
 Iowa Highway 243 (former)
 K-243 (Kansas highway)
 Kentucky Route 243
 Maryland Route 243
 Minnesota State Highway 243
 Montana Secondary Highway 243
 New Mexico State Road 243
 New York State Route 243
 Ohio State Route 243
 Pennsylvania Route 243 (former)
 South Carolina Highway 243
 Tennessee State Route 243
 Texas State Highway 243
Farm to Market Road 243 (former)
 Ranch to Market Road 243
 Utah State Route 243
 Vermont Route 243
 Virginia State Route 243
 Washington State Route 243
 Wisconsin Highway 243

See also
 List of highways numbered 242
 List of highways numbered 244